Clathrosepta is a genus of sea snails, marine gastropod mollusks in the family Fissurellidae, the keyhole limpets.

Species
Species within the genus Clathrosepta include:

Clathrosepta becki McLean & Geiger, 1998
Clathrosepta depressa McLean & Geiger, 1998

References

Fissurellidae